Paul McKenna (1904 – 28 August 1956) was an Irish hurler who played as a midfielder for the Tipperary senior team. 

McKenna made his first appearance for the team during the 1929 championship and was a regular member of the starting for the next three seasons. During that time he won one All-Ireland medal and one Munster medal. 

At club level McKenna began his career with Shinrone before later joining Borrisokane.

References

1904 births
1956 deaths
Borrisokane hurlers
Tipperary inter-county hurlers
All-Ireland Senior Hurling Championship winners
Shinrone hurlers